George Milward Boyd (October 12, 1851 – March 23, 1940) was an Ontario businessman and political figure. He represented Grey North in the Legislative Assembly of Ontario from 1898 to 1902 as a Conservative member.

He was born in St. Vincent Township, Grey County, Canada West, the son of Samuel C. Boyd. He imported and exported livestock. In 1874, Boyd married Katherine Vance.

He died on March 23, 1940, in Owen Sound and was buried at Greenwood Cemetery at that same city.

References

External links 

1851 births
1940 deaths
Progressive Conservative Party of Ontario MPPs